Giusto Fontanini (30 October 1666 in San Daniele del Friuli – 17 April 1736 in Rome) was a Roman Catholic archbishop and an Italian historian.

Biography

A prelate and attentive bibliophile, in 1697 became a stubborn and reactionary defender of the Papal Curia. In 1708, he was a protagonist of a contentious controversy over the possession of the territory of Comacchio between the Papacy and the Este Dukes of Modena along with their protector, the Austrian Hapsburg empire. In 1597, the then Duke of Ferrara Alfonso II d'Este died without heirs. While the Holy Roman Emperor Rudolf II recognized as heir to Alfonso, his cousin Cesare d'Este, his dubious legitimacy led the papal states to claim the Duchy of Ferrara, including Comacchio. Cesare and his successors were constrained to the Duchy of Modena. However in 1708, an Austrian army claimed Commacchio by marching an army to occupy the town. While the Papacy gathered an army to confront the imperial garrison, the rival political and legal claims were trumpeted in competing scholarly treatises: the Este claim by the erudite Ludovico Antonio Muratori, while Fontanini defended the papal claim. With free access to Vatican papers, Fontanini relied on countless texts and composed equally erudite works such as De antiquitatibus Hortae coloniae Etruscorum (1708), Dissertatio de corona ferrea langobardorum, Delle masnade ed altri servi secondo l'uso dei Longobardi and several others. Ultimately, the papacy acquiesed to the occupation for some decades. 

Fontanini's most important work is the "Library of Italian Eloquence" (1726), a bibliography of the letters, later corrected and supplemented by Apostolo Zeno, historian and poet (1753). The importance of this project is highlighted in the subtitle: Where are neatly arranged works printed in our vulgar language over the disciplines and the main subjects. A classification of knowledge, then, but with a revolutionary linguistic plan: the vulgar, now national language. The disciplines in which he shares his library of eloquence are: grammar, rhetoric, poetry, dramatic (theater), lyricism, history, philosophy, theology. There are, and legitimate, both vulgar works and the vulgarizations of ancient works.

Sharp criticism by the intellectuals of the time for the many omissions and inaccuracies does not diminish the value of this Library, which is recognized as the first step in the arrangement of Italian works.

References

External links 
 

1666 births
1736 deaths
18th-century Italian Roman Catholic archbishops
18th-century Italian historians